Horrified is the only full-length studio album to date by American grindcore band Repulsion. This album was influential on later goregrind bands. Although the album was originally recorded in 1986, it remained unreleased until three years later. It was originally released on Necrosis Records, a sublabel of Earache Records run by Jeff Walker and Bill Steer of the band Carcass.

Album information
The album was originally released in 1986 as a demo called Slaughter of the Innocent. Necrosis Records officially released the album as Horrified in 1989. The tracks were recorded in June 1986 at a basement studio in Flint, Michigan. They were then remixed in March 1989 at Silver Tortoise Soundlab, Ann Arbor, Michigan by Jonas Berzanskis, Scott Carlson and Aaron Freeman, and produced by Doug Earp and Repulsion.

In 1991, Repulsion got back together and recorded a demo titled Rebirth, some of which appeared on the Excruciation 7" released through Relapse Records. After the success of the 7", Relapse reissued Horrified in 1992. In 2002, Horrified was reissued again by Relapse, this time with a bonus CD consisting of various demos and other recordings titled Rarities.

Track listing
Horrified
 "The Stench of Burning Death" – 1:33
 "Eaten Alive" – 1:38
 "Acid Bath" – 1:30
 "Slaughter of the Innocent" – 1:32
 "Decomposed" – 1:21
 "Radiation Sickness" – 2:04
 "Splattered Cadavers" – 1:24
 "Festering Boils" – 1:52
 "Pestilent Decay" – 1:03
 "Crematorium" – 1:29
 "Driven to Insanity" – 1:39
 "Six Feet Under" – 1:11
 "Bodily Dismemberment" – 1:45
 "Repulsion" – 1:44
 "The Lurking Fear" – 1:09
 "Black Breath" – 2:16
 "Maggots in Your Coffin" – 1:45
 "Horrified" – 2:04

1992 Relapse CD Bonus Track:
 "Black Nightmare" – 2:08

Bonus CD: Rarities
 "Armies of the Dead" – 2:24 (Genocide rehearsal demo, Nov. '84)
 "Satan's Whores" – 2:36 (Genocide rehearsal demo, Nov. '84)
 "Crack of Doom" – 2:30 (Genocide rehearsal demo, Nov. '84)
 "Armies of the Dead" – 1:43 (Genocide Violent Death demo, Autumn '85)
 "Six Feet Under" – 1:33 (Genocide Violent Death demo, Autumn '85)
 "Violent Death" – 1:05 (Genocide Violent Death demo, Autumn '85)
 "The Lurking Fear" – 1:34 (Genocide Violent Death demo, Autumn '85)
 "Crack of Doom" – 2:00 (Genocide Violent Death demo, Autumn '85)
 "Horrified" – 2:32 (Genocide Violent Death demo, Autumn '85)
 "The Stench of Burning Death" – 1:30 (Genocide WFBE demo, 26 Jan. '86)
 "Decomposed" – 1:34 (Genocide WFBE demo, 26 Jan. '86)
 "Slaughter of the Innocent" – 1:50 (Genocide WFBE demo, 26 Jan. '86)
 "Eaten Alive" – 1:50 (Genocide WFBE demo, 26 Jan. '86)
 "Six Feet Under" – 1:19 (Genocide WFBE demo, 26 Jan. '86)
 "Crypt of Terror" – 1:48 (Genocide WFBE demo, 26 Jan. '86)
 "The Lurking Fear" – 1:19 (Genocide WFBE demo, 26 Jan. '86)
 "Festering Boils" – 1:56 (Genocide WFBE demo, 26 Jan. '86)
 "Pestilent Decay" – 1:14 (Genocide WFBE demo, 26 Jan. '86)
 "Black Nightmare" – 2:03 (Genocide WFBE demo, 26 Jan. '86)
 "Bodily Dismemberment" – 1:55 (Genocide WFBE demo, 26 Jan. '86)
 "Horrified" – 2:14  (Genocide WFBE demo, 26 Jan. '86)
 "Radiation Sickness" – 2:06 (Genocide Live, 14 May '86)
 "Black Breath" – 2:17 (Genocide Live, 14 May '86)
 "Excruciation" – 3:31 (Repulsion Excruciation EP/demo)
 "Helga (Lost Her Head)" – 3:25 (Repulsion Excruciation EP/demo)
 "Rebirth" – 3:06 (Repulsion Excruciation EP/demo)
 "House of Freaks" – 2:42 (Repulsion Excruciation EP/demo)
 "Depraved" – 2:59 (Repulsion final demos, 1991)
 "Face of Decay" – 3:15 (Repulsion final demos, 1991)
 "Something Dead"  – 3:31 (Repulsion final demos, 1991)

References

1989 debut albums
Repulsion (band) albums
Southern Lord Records albums
Earache Records albums